Diogo Pinto may refer to:
Diogo Pinto (activist) (born 1974), Portuguese activist
Diogo Pinto (footballer) (born 1999), Portuguese footballer